An infinite regress is when there is an unending chain of causes:
 Regress argument is the epistemological problem of infinite regress
 Infinite Regress (Star Trek: Voyager) is the 101st episode of Star Trek: Voyager, the seventh episode of the fifth season
 apparent infinite regress found with an infinity mirror
 summing infinite regress convergent sequence
 infinite regress of cause and effect in feedback

See also
"An Infinite Regress", a song by Animals as Leaders from Weightless, 2011